The island whistler (Pachycephala phaionota) is a species of bird in the family Pachycephalidae endemic to the Moluccas (Indonesia). Its natural habitats are subtropical or tropical dry forests and subtropical or tropical mangrove forests.

The island whistler was originally described in the genus Myiolestes (a synonym for Colluricincla).

References

island whistler
Birds of the Maluku Islands
island whistler
island whistler
Taxonomy articles created by Polbot